Ágúst Guðmundsson (born 29 June 1947) is an Icelandic film director and screenwriter.

He studied French, Icelandic in Reykjavík and filmmaking at the National Film School in London. He has made many popular Icelandic films that have also been translated into other languages. His 1998 film The Dance was entered into the 21st Moscow International Film Festival where he won the Silver St. George for Best Director.

He is currently director of BÍL, The Federation of Icelandic Artists.

Films
 Land and Sons (Land og synir, 1980)
 Outlaw: The Saga of Gisli (Útlaginn, 1981)
 On Top (Með allt á hreinu, 1982)
 Golden Sands (Gullsandur, 1984)
 Nonni und Manni (TV series, 6 episodes, 1988-1989)
 The Dance (Dansinn, 1998)
 The Seagull's Laughter (Mávahlátur, 2001)
 Ahead of Time (Í takt við tímann, 2004)
 Spooks and Spirits (Ófeigur gengur aftur, 2013)

References

External links
 Ágúst Guðmundsson in the IMDB
 BÍL

1947 births
Living people
Agust Gudmundsson
Agust Gudmundsson
Icelandic screenwriters
Male screenwriters